The Roman Catholic Diocese of Hradec Králové is a diocese located in the city of Hradec Králové in the Ecclesiastical province of Prague in the Czech Republic.

History
 November 10, 1664: Established as Diocese of Hradec Králové from Metropolitan Archdiocese of Praha
 On 28 June 1972 Pope Paul VI – by his Apostolic constitution Episcoporum Poloniae coetus – redrew boundaries of a number of Polish – and their adjacent Czech and German – dioceses, disentangling the County of Kladsko area from the Diocese of Hradec Králové and assigning it to the neighbouring Archdiocese of Wrocław.

Leadership
 Bishops of Hradec Králové (Roman rite)
 Bishop Matthäus Ferdinand Sobek von Bilenberg, O.S.B. (10 November 1664 – 11 March 1669), appointed Archbishop of Prague
 Bishop Johann Friedrich Reichsgraf von Waldstein (16 June 1668 – 2 December 1675), appointed Archbishop of Prague
 Bishop Johann Franz Christoph Freiherr von Talmberg (15 January 1676 – 3 April 1698)
 Bishop Gottfried Freiherr Kapaun von Swoykow (23 September 1698 – 18 September 1701)
 Bishop Tobias Johannes Becker (24 November 1701 – 11 September 1710)
 Bishop Johann Adam Reichsgraf von Wratislaw von Mitrowitz (12 November 1710 – 24 September 1721), appointed Bishop of Litomerice
 Bishop Wenzel Franz Karl Reichsfreiherr Koschinsky von Koschín (9 January 1721 – 26 March 1731)
 Bishop Moritz Adolf Karl Herzog von Sachsen-Zeitz (8 October 1731 – 1 October 1733), appointed Bishop of Litomerice
 Bishop Johann Joseph von Wratislaw von Mitrowitz (6 July 1733 – 11 September 1753)
 Archbishop (personal title) Anton Peter Graf Przichowsky von Przichowitz (29 September 1753 – 26 October 1763), succeeded as Archbishop of Prague
 Bishop Hermann Hannibal Reichsgraf von Blümegen (5 November 1763 – 17 October 1774)
 Bishop Johann Andreas Kayser von Kaysern (14 May 1775 – 5 May 1776)
 Bishop  (15 July 1776 – 1 January 1780), appointed Bishop of Seckau, Austria; future Archbishop
 Bishop Johann Leopold Ritter von Hay (29 July 1780 – 1 June 1794)
 Bishop Maria-Thaddeus von Trauttmansdorf-Wiesnberg (1 July 1795 – 26 November 1811), appointed Archbishop of Olomouc (Cardinal in 1816)
 Bishop Alois Jozef Krakowski von Kolowrat (15 March 1815 – 28 February 1831), appointed Archbishop of Prague
 Bishop Karel Boromejský Hanl z Kirchtreu (24 February 1832 – 1874)
 Bishop Josef Jan Hais (5 July 1875 – 27 October 1892)
 Bishop Eduard Jan Brynyck (19 January 1893 – 20 November 1902)
 Bishop Josef Doubrava (22 June 1903 – 22 February 1921)
 Bishop Karel Kašpar (13 June 1921 – 22 October 1931), appointed Archbishop of Prague (Cardinal in 1935)
 Bishop Maurizio Picha (22 October 1931 – 12 November 1956)
 Bishop Karel Otcenášek (Apostolic Administrator 30 March 1950 – 21 December 1989); see below
 Bishop Karel Otcenášek (21 December 1989 – 6 June 1998); see above; became an Archbishop later in 1998
 Bishop Dominik Duka, O.P. (6 June 1998 – 13 February 2010), appointed Archbishop of Prague (Cardinal in 2012)
 Bishop Jan Vokál (3 March 2011 – )

See also
Roman Catholicism in the Czech Republic

Sources
 GCatholic.org
 Catholic Hierarchy
  Diocese website

Notes

Roman Catholic dioceses in the Czech Republic
Religious organizations established in the 1660s
1664 establishments in the Holy Roman Empire
Hradec Králové
Roman Catholic dioceses and prelatures established in the 17th century